My Sister Eileen is a 1942 American comedy film directed by Alexander Hall and starring Rosalind Russell, Brian Aherne and Janet Blair. The screenplay by Joseph A. Fields and Jerome Chodorov is based on their 1940 play of the same title, which was inspired by a series of autobiographical short stories by Ruth McKenney originally published in The New Yorker.   The supporting cast features George Tobias, Allyn Joslyn, Grant Mitchell, Gordon Jones and, in a cameo appearance at the end, The Three Stooges (Moe Howard, Larry Fine and Curly Howard).

Plot
Anxious to help boost the career of her aspiring actress sister Eileen, reporter Ruth Sherwood of the Columbus Courier writes a rave review about her performance in a local play before it opens. When Eileen is replaced on opening night and the newspaper mistakenly runs the inaccurate review, Ruth is fired.

Grandma Sherwood urges Ruth to move to New York City and Eileen decides to go with her. Relying solely on $100 given to them by their father Walter for financial support, the girls are forced to rent a dingy basement studio apartment in a Greenwich Village building owned by Mr. Appopolous. Their first day there is disturbed by workmen blasting to build a subway tunnel, passing drunkards harassing them through their windows, and Officer Lonigan, who warns them to stop causing disturbances.

The following day, Eileen meets reporter Chic Clark at the Wallace Theatrical Production office, while Ruth seeks employment at Manhatter, where she has an argument with magazine owner Ralph Craven and leaves in a huff. Editor Robert Baker finds the manuscript she accidentally left behind in an envelope bearing her home address, and he decides to deliver it to her.

Meanwhile, Ruth arrives home to discover Eileen has invited drugstore clerk Frank Lippincott to dinner. When an inebriated man searching for previous tenant Effie Shelton starts creating trouble, Eileen asks their neighbor, football player Wreck Loomis, to throw him out. Wreck asks if he can stay with the girls while his mother-in-law Mrs. Wade visits because she still does not know her daughter Helen is married.

Frank arrives for dinner, followed in quick succession by Chic, Wreck, a man carrying the unconscious Effie, and Robert, who tells Ruth he wants to discuss her manuscript. They go to a nearby restaurant, where he encourages her to write about her eccentric life. He is delighted with the story she submits, but Ralph rejects it, prompting Robert to announce he is quitting.

Back at the Sherwood apartment, Effie inadvertently reveals Helen and Wreck are married to Mrs. Wade, who is upset by the news. Ruth receives a call from Chic's editor asking her to go to Brooklyn to cover the arrival of the Portuguese Merchant Marine fleet and, delighted with the assignment, she rushes off. Unbeknownst to her, it actually was Chic who called, hoping his ruse would allow him to spend time with Eileen alone. Robert arrives, rescues Eileen from Chic's unwanted advances, and invites her and Ruth to dinner to celebrate his quitting his job.

Robert leaves, and Ruth arrives with the Portuguese Merchant Marines in hot pursuit. The sisters form a Conga line to lure the sailors outside, resulting in a wild party in the street, and Eileen is arrested for disturbing the peace. The following morning, Grandma and Walter Sherwood unexpectedly arrive at the apartment. While Ruth tries to conceal Eileen's predicament from them, Wreck and Helen announce they have remarried to appease Mrs. Wade, Helen casually mentions Wreck has been living with the girls, Eileen and the Merchant Marines arrive, and their commander presents her with a medal for spending the night in jail. Horrified by this seemingly endless parade of odd characters, Mr. Sherwood insists the sisters return home immediately.

While Ruth is packing, Robert arrives with a check for $250 as payment for her story, which has been published in the latest issue of Manhatter. Overjoyed, Ruth signs a six-month lease and tells her father she wants to stay in New York. Ralph offers Ruth a contract for her stories, and she agrees on the condition he will introduce Eileen to a few theatre producers. As they leave the apartment to celebrate, a trio of construction workers (The Three Stooges in a cameo appearance) drill through the floor from the new subway tunnel below. The film ends with Curly saying, "Hey, Moe. I think you made a wrong turn!"

Cast
 Rosalind Russell as Ruth Sherwood 
 Brian Aherne as Robert Baker 
 Janet Blair as Eileen Sherwood 
 George Tobias as Appopolous 
 Allyn Joslyn as Chic Clark 
 Grant Mitchell as Walter Sherwood 
 Gordon Jones as Wreck Loomis 
 Elizabeth Patterson as Grandma Sherwood 
 Richard Quine as Frank Lippincott 
 June Havoc as Effie Shelton 
 Donald MacBride as Officer Lonigan 
 Clyde Fillmore as Ralph Craven 
 [Miss] Jeff Donnell as Helen Loomis
 The Three Stooges:
 Moe Howard as Moe (uncredited)
 Larry Fine as Larry (uncredited)
 Curly Howard as Curly (uncredited)

Critical reception
Bosley Crowther of The New York Times called the film "largely a farcical juggling act in which the authors . . . keep their characters spinning more through speed than grace. Some of it is forced almost to snapping; some of it drags heavily on the screen. And Alexander Hall, the director, did little with his camera in that small room. But Rosalind Russell plays the smart sister with a delightfully dour and cynical air, and Janet Blair is disarmingly naive as the pretty, desirable one . . . My Sister Eileen is gay and bouncing."

In his review of the DVD release of the film, Steve Daly of Entertainment Weekly graded it B+, calling it "a screwball spleenfest, pitching gag after fastball gag." He added, "While the tone is farcical, there's an edge to the movie's depiction of single-gal city life."

Awards and nominations
Rosalind Russell was nominated for the Academy Award for Best Actress but lost to Greer Garson in Mrs. Miniver.

Adaptations in other media
Aherne, Russell, and Blair reprised their parts on the Lux Radio Theater adaptation of My Sister Eileen on July 5, 1943, and again on The Screen Guild Theater adaptation on October 18, 1943.

On May 18, 1946, My Sister Eileen was again adapted as a radio play on Academy Award Theater, in recognition of Russell's Oscar nomination. Russell and Blair reprised their parts.

References

External links
 
 
 
 

1942 films
American comedy films
American films based on plays
American black-and-white films
Films set in New York City
Columbia Pictures films
The Three Stooges films
1942 comedy films
Films about writers
Films directed by Alexander Hall
1940s American films